Sammi Brown (born December 21, 1984) is an American politician and labor organizer who served as a member of the West Virginia House of Delegates for the 65th district from December 1, 2018 to November 30, 2020.

Early life and education 
Brown was born and raised in Charles Town, West Virginia. She earned a Bachelor of Arts degree in mass communication and a Master of Business Administration in marketing from Shepherd University.

Career 
From 2009 to 2014, Brown worked in production and public relations for several and television and radio stations, including WDVM-TV, WSHC, and WIHT. In 2014, she became a campaign coordinator for the West Virginia chapter of the AFL–CIO. From 2016 to 2017, she was the director of marketing and communications at Geostellar, a solar energy company. In 2017 and 2018, she was the federal campaigns director for the West Virginia Healthy Kids and Families Coalition. She has also worked as a trainer for the National Democratic Training Committee.

In 2016, Brown ran unsuccessfully for a seat in the West Virginia House of Delegates. She rain again in 2018 defeating incumbent Jill Upson, and assumed office on November 30, 2018. In her 2020 re-election campaign, Brown was narrowly defeated by Republican nominee Wayne Clark.

References 

Living people
1984 births
People from Charles Town, West Virginia
Shepherd University alumni
Democratic Party members of the West Virginia House of Delegates
Women state legislators in West Virginia
African-American state legislators in West Virginia
People from Jefferson County, West Virginia
21st-century African-American people
20th-century African-American people
20th-century African-American women
21st-century African-American women